USS Minneapolis-Saint Paul (LCS-21)  is a  littoral combat ship of the United States Navy.  She is the second ship in naval service named after Minnesota's Twin Cities.

Design 
In 2002, the US Navy initiated a program to develop the first of a fleet of littoral combat ships. The Navy initially ordered two monohull ships from Lockheed Martin, which became known as the Freedom-class littoral combat ships after the first ship of the class, . Odd-numbered U.S. Navy littoral combat ships are built using the Freedom-class monohull design, while even-numbered ships are based on a competing design, the trimaran hull  from General Dynamics. The initial order of littoral combat ships involved a total of four ships, including two of the Freedom-class design.  Minneapolis-Saint Paul is the eleventh Freedom-class littoral combat ship to be built.

Construction and career 
On 29 December 2010, Marinette Marine was awarded the contract to build the ship in Marinette, Wisconsin.

The ship was christened at the Marinette shipyard in 2019. The commissioning ceremony was expected to take place in the spring of 2021 before a problem with the propulsion system was discovered. On 15 June 2021, Minneapolis-St. Paul was launched in Marinette. The Navy commissioned the ship on 21 May 2022 in Duluth, Minnesota under the command of Commander Alfonza White.

In September 2022, the ship was involved in a collision with Danmark, a 252-foot full-rigged ship. Danmark was being towed by a tugboat when she collided with the stationary Minneapolis-Saint Paul. No injuries were reported.

References

 
 

Freedom-class littoral combat ships
Lockheed Martin
2019 ships